Wings of Fire (aka The Cloudburst) is a 1967 American made-for-television action-drama film for broadcast on National Broadcasting Company (NBC), directed by David Lowell Rich. The film starred Suzanne Pleshette, James Farentino, Lloyd Nolan, Juliet Mills, Jeremy Slate and Ralph Bellamy. The plot concerns a female pilot wanting to become an air racer.

Plot
Doug Sanborn (Ralph Bellamy) runs a small charter company based at a regional airport. His daughter, Kitty (Suzanne Pleshette), a young female pilot wants to be in the Unlimited class at the air races but her male friends stymie her ambitions. Her former boyfriend Taff Malloy (James Farentino) has recently come back from the US Navy and a stint as a pilot in Vietnam. Now married to Lisa (Juliet Mills), a tragic accident on their honeymoon, results in his wife's death.

With Lisa's recent death, Kitty tries to console Taff but he is distraught and rebuffs her. In frustration, she seeks out Taff's rival, bad-boy pilot Hal Random (Jeremy Slate) and runs off with him. When her father  and other male friends find out about the affair, they berate Kitty and make her feel so bad she wants to kill herself.

Flying her North American P-51 Mustang racing aircraft with the intention of crashing it, Kitty is followed by Taff in his Grumman F8F Bearcat, who tries to talk her out of it. His soothing words finally make an impression and help to bring Kitty back safely.

Cast

 Suzanne Pleshette as Kitty Sanborn
 James Farentino as Taff Malloy
 Lloyd Nolan as Max Clarity
 Juliet Mills as Lisa
 Jeremy Slate as Hal Random
 Ralph Bellamy as Doug Sanborn
 Gary Crosby as Scott
 Jaime Sánchez as Luis Passos

Production
Although Wings of Fire was set in Florida, the actual location shooting took place  at Brackett Field, La Verne/Pamona, California. The aircraft seen in the film were: Douglas C-47J Skytrain, Republic RC-3-1 Seabee, North American P-51D Mustang, Grumman F8F Bearcat and LeVier Cosmic Wind. In the opening credits, Tallmantz Aviation Inc. and Frank Tallman as technical advisor are credited with working on the film.

Reception
Film historians Jack Hardwick and Ed Schnepf in their listing of "A Viewer's Guide to Aviation Movies", dismissed Wings of Fire as, "This is it! Our nomination for the worst air movie ever made ... Sicky story of woman pilot and returned veteran with a hangup. One P-51D and one Bearcat, that's all. In a similar review, aviation film historian Stephen Pendo considered Wings of Fire, "... below-average."

See also
 Reno Air Races

References

Notes

Bibliography

 Hardwick, Jack and Ed Schnepf. "A Viewer's Guide to Aviation Movies". The Making of the Great Aviation Films, General Aviation Series, Volume 2, 1989.
 Pendo, Stephen. Aviation in the Cinema. Lanham, Maryland: Scarecrow Press, 1985. .

External links
 Wings of Fire at Moviefone.com

1967 television films
1967 films
American aviation films
Films set in 1967
Films shot in the United States
Films set in Vietnam
Vietnam War aviation films
Films about the United States Navy
NBC network original films
Films directed by David Lowell Rich
1960s American films